Zubov is a family of Russian nobility that came to power in the late 18th century. It may also refer to:

People
Zubov (surname)

Other
Zubov Bay, a bay on the west side of the Antarctic Peninsula
Zubov's method, used in control theory, proposed in 1961 by Vladimir Ivanovich Zubov
Zubovo
Zubova Polyana